The Barnegat Light Public School was the one-room schoolhouse for the borough of Barnegat Light, Ocean County, New Jersey, United States, from 1903 until June 15, 1951.  It became the Barnegat Light Historical Society Museum in 1954.

Among other things, the museum houses the first degree Fresnel lens from Barnegat Lighthouse.

The schoolhouse was added to the National Register of Historic Places in 1976.

See also
National Register of Historic Places listings in Ocean County, New Jersey
List of museums in New Jersey

References

External links

 Barnegat Light Historical Society Museum

Barnegat Light, New Jersey
Museums in Ocean County, New Jersey
History museums in New Jersey
School buildings on the National Register of Historic Places in New Jersey
One-room schoolhouses in New Jersey
Schoolhouses in the United States
Former school buildings in the United States
Defunct schools in New Jersey
Long Beach Island
Educational institutions disestablished in 1951
National Register of Historic Places in Ocean County, New Jersey